Many of the Jews expelled from the Iberian Peninsula during the Spanish Inquisition settled in the Ottoman Empire, leaving behind, at the wake of Empire, large Sephardic communities in South-East Europe: mainly in Bulgaria, Turkey, Greece, Bosnia and Herzegovina and Serbia.

Bosnia and Herzegovina 
 Kalmi Baruh, writer and philosopher
 Emerik Blum, businessman, founder of Energoinvest, former Mayor of Sarajevo
 Ivan Ceresnjes, architect-researcher, former president of the Jewish community in Bosnia and Herzegovina and vice-chairman of the Yugoslav Federation of Jewish Communities, 1992–1996
 Oskar Danon, composer and conductor
 David Elazar, Israeli general and Chief of Staff of Israel Defense Forces
Jakob Finci, politician, ambassador of Bosnia and Herzegovina to Switzerland
Daniel Kabiljo, painter
Daniel Ozmo, painter
 Isaac Pardo, rabbi of Sarajevo 
 Robert Rothbart, basketball player (Jewish mother)
 Isak Samokovlija, writer

Bulgaria 

 Albert Aftalion, Bulgarian-born French economist
 Binyamin Arditi
 Aron Aronov, tenor
 Mira Aroyo, member of the band Ladytron
 Gabi Ashkenazi
 Michael Bar-Zohar
 Maxim Behar, president of M3 Communications Group
 Shimon Bejarano
 Alexander Bozhkov, vice-premier (Jewish mother)
 Elias Canetti, author and Nobel Prize winner
 Carl Djerassi
 Itzhak Fintzi, dramatist
 Pini Gershon
 Moshe Gueron
 Shlomo Kalo
 Nikolay Kaufman, musicologist and composer
 Yehezkel Lazarov
 Moshe Leon
 Milcho Leviev, jazz composer (Jewish father)
 Raphael Mechoulam
 Moni Moshonov
 Ya'akov Nehushtan
 Ya'akov Nitzani
 Jules Pascin, artist (Jewish father)
 Isaac Passy, philosopher
 Solomon Passy, foreign minister, son of Isaac Passy
 Valeri Petrov
 Georgi Pirinski, Jr.
 David Primo
 Sarah-Theodora
 Victor Shem-Tov
 Maxim Staviski
 Angel Wagenstein, author & screenwriter
 Alexis Weissenberg, pianist
 Jaime Yankelevich
 Emanuel Zisman

Croatia 

 Viktor Axmann, architect 
 Slavko Brill, sculptor and ceramics artist 
 Julio Deutsch, architect 
 Hugo Ehrlich, architect 
 Ignjat Fischer, architect 
 Josip Frank, Croatian politician
 Stjepan Gomboš, architect 
 Branko Grünbaum, mathematician
 Leo Hönigsberg, architect 
 Rikard Lang, prominent Croatian university professor, lawyer and economist, UN's expert
 Slobodan Lang, physician, politician, humanitarian
 Slavko Löwy, architect
 Rudolf Lubinski, architect
 Branko Lustig, film producer and winner of two Academy Awards
 Blessed Ivan Merz, beatified in 2003
 Oscar Nemon, sculptor
 Vladimir Šterk, architect
 Ivo Stern, founder of the "Zagreb Radiostation"
 Karlo Weissmann, physician and founder of the first sanatorium in Osijek
 Dragutin Wolf, industrialist, founder of the food company Koestlin in Bjelovar

Cyprus 

 Aristobulus of Britannia (converted to Christianity)
 Barnabas (mentioned in the New Testament)
 Mike Brant, French-based singer (Cyprus-born)
 Epiphanius of Salamis (converted to Christianity)
 John the Merciful
 Arie Zeev Raskin, rabbi

Greece 

Hank Azaria
Sid Ganis
Anna Rezan

Montenegro 

 Jelena Đurović, writer, politician and journalist

North Macedonia 

Haim Estreya Ovadya, Yugoslav partisan

Serbia 

 David Albahari, writer
 David Albala, military officer, physician, diplomat, and Jewish community leader
 Oskar Danon, composer
 Oskar Davičo, poet
 Filip David, playwright and columnist
 Predrag Ejdus, actor
 Vanja Ejdus, actress
 Rahela Ferari, actress
 Ivan Ivanji, writer
 Enriko Josif, composer
 Danilo Kiš, writer
 Marko Kon, pop singer
 Shaul Ladany, Holocaust survivor, racewalker and two-time Olympian
 Tommy Lapid, former Israeli politician of Hungarian descent, born in Novi Sad
 Paulina Lebl-Albala, feminist, translator, literary critic, literature theoretician, and professor of literature in Belgrade
 Sonja Licht, political activist
 Izidor Papo, cardiac surgeon, general-colonel of the Yugoslav Army medical unit
 Moša Pijade, politician, painter, art critic and publicist
 Eva Ras, actress
 Seka Sablić, actress
 Erich Šlomović, art collector
 Aleksandar Tišma, writer

Slovenia 

Katja Boh, politician
Berta Bojetu, author
Israel Isserlin, Medieval rabbi
Lev Kreft, sociologist and politician
Dušan Šarotar, author and editor

Turkey

See also 
 List of Bosnians
 List of Bulgarians
 List of Croatians
 List of Greeks
 List of Serbs
 List of Slovenians
 List of Turks

References 

Lists of Jews
Jews,South-East European